Maria Borodakova (born 8 March 1986) is a volleyball player from Russia, playing as a middle-blocker. She was a member of the Women's National Team that won the gold medal at the 2006 FIVB Women's World Championship and the 2010 FIVB Women's World Championship.

Career
Maria won the bronze medal and the "Best Best Blocker" award at the 2011-12 CEV Champions League, after her Russian team Dinamo Kazan defeated Italian MC-Carnaghi Villa Cortese.

Borodakova won the 2014 FIVB Club World Championship gold medal, playing with the Russian club Dinamo Kazan that defeated 3-0 the Brazilian Molico Osasco in the championship match.

Awards

Individuals
 2011–12 CEV Champions League "Best Blocker"

Clubs
 2011-12 CEV Champions League -  Bronze medal, with Dinamo Kazan
 2014 FIVB Club World Championship -  Champion, with Dinamo Kazan

References

External links
 Profile at FIVB

1986 births
Living people
Russian women's volleyball players
Volleyball players at the 2008 Summer Olympics
Volleyball players at the 2012 Summer Olympics
Olympic volleyball players of Russia
Place of birth missing (living people)
Eczacıbaşı volleyball players
Sportspeople from Nizhny Novgorod
Universiade medalists in volleyball
Universiade gold medalists for Russia
Medalists at the 2013 Summer Universiade